Sounds is an album by American jazz saxophonist Rob Brown recorded in 2006 and released on the Portuguese Clean Feed label. Instead of the conventional sax-bass-drums trio, it features an alternative combination with Brown on alto sax, Daniel Levin on cello and Japanese Satoshi Takeishi on a percussion set completed with taiko drums.

The title track is a three-part suite composed for a multimedia performance that includes dance and visual art. It was debuted at the 2005 Vision Festival with the Nancy Zendora Dance Company and video art by Jo Wood-Brown.

Reception

The All About Jazz review by Sean Patrick Fitzell notes that "The textural range of the instrumentation, particularly the exotic percussion and the music's spaciousness of form allows for non-idiomatic exploration that is not strictly free improvisation."

The Penguin Guide to Jazz states "A logical move to employ Levin, given how much Brown seems to relish a singing bass tone and long, legato lines... Things as 'Stutter Step' underline how much of Brown's language still comes from the '60s avant-garde, but there is considerable more going on here."

Track listing
All compositions by Rob Brown except as indicated
 "Sounds part I Archaeology" – 12:30
 "Sounds part II Antics" – 6:27
 "Sounds part III Astir" – 10:34
 "Sutter Step" – 4:25
 "Tibetan Folk Song" (Traditional) – 8:47
 "Sinew" – 7:33
 "Moment of Pause" – 7:23

Personnel
Rob Brown – alto sax
Daniel Levin - cello
Satoshi Takeishi – percussion

References

2007 albums
Rob Brown (saxophonist) albums
Clean Feed Records albums